The Bandiagara Escarpment is an escarpment in the Dogon country of Mali.

The area of the escarpment is inhabited today by the Dogon people. Before the Dogon, the escarpment was inhabited by the Tellem and Toloy peoples. Many structures remain from the Tellem. The Bandiagara Escarpment was listed in the UNESCO World Heritage List in 1989.

Because of its archaeological, ethnological and geological characteristics, the entire site is one of the most imposing in West Africa.

History

The cave-dwelling Tellem, an ethnic group later pushed out by the arrival of the Dogons, used to live in the slopes of the cliff. The Tellem legacy is evident in the caves they carved into the cliffs so that they could bury their dead high up, far from the frequent flash floods of the area.

Dozens of villages are located along the cliff, such as Kani Bonzon. It was near this village that the Dogons arrived in the 14th century, and from there they spread over the plateau, the escarpment and the plains of the Seno-Gondo.

According to local oral history, the Dogon were relatively undisturbed by French colonial powers due to natural tunnels weaving through the Bandiagara Escarpment. Only the Dogon knew of the tunnels, and were able to use them to ambush and repel aggressors.

The Bandiagara Escarpment today

Today, local guides escort tourist groups along the escarpment to visit Dogon villages. A series of trails runs along the cliffs, and hostels in each village provide food and lodging. The host villages receive income from the hostels and the tourist tax. Large increases in tourism to the area are expected, as a new highway is constructed, putting pressure on local, traditional cultures. In addition, The Independent reports that looting of ancient artifacts is widespread in the area, which is poorly policed.

To call attention to the issue of uncontrolled tourist visitation, the World Monuments Fund included the Bandiagara Escarpment in the 2004 World Monuments Watch. In 2005, WMF provided a grant from American Express to the Mission Culturelle de Bandiagara for the development of a management plan. Beyond the protection of traditional buildings, the management plan calls for the regulation of new construction through the establishment of strict building guidelines, such as those that govern new development in historic districts around the world.

After the 2012 war in Mali, central areas of the country, including the Dogon Plateau and Bandiagara Escarpment, have become increasingly dangerous. Terrorist groups operate in the area, and violence between local ethnicities occurs on a daily basis.

As of 2018, it is extremely inadvisable to travel to this area for tourism, and Malian security forces have been known to turn back those who attempt to do so. In March 2018, an armed group attacked a hotel frequented by UN staff in the town of Bandiagara, killing several people.

Gallery

See also
Bandiagara
Cliff Palace

References

External links 
 UNESCO - Cliff of Bandiagara (Land of the Dogons)
 Thierry Joffroy and Lassana Cissé, "Culture at a Crossroads: For Mali’s Bandiagara Escarpment, extraordinary geology and human genius have conspired to create one of the world’s great cultural landscapes. For the Dogon cliff-dwellers who live there, the future hangs in the balance." ICON Magazine, Fall 2005, p. 38-45.

Archaeological sites in Mali
World Heritage Sites in Mali
Escarpments of Africa
Landforms of Mali
Cliffs
Former populated places in Mali
Cliff dwellings
Dogon history
Dogon Country
Dogon holy places
Archaeological sites of Western Africa